Xiantao Power Station is a coal-fired power station currently under construction in Xiantao, Hubei, China. Two 660 MW units are under construction. The first phase is expected to start operation in May 2022.

The power station will be connected to the Jianghan Plain railway.

References 

Power stations in Hubei